Pavel Pavlovich Petrov (born 20 March 1987) is a Russian sprint canoeist who has competed since the late 2000s. He won a bronze medal in the C-2 500 m event at the 2010 ICF Canoe Sprint World Championships in Poznań.

References
2010 ICF Canoe Sprint World Championships men's C-2 500 m A final results. – accessed 22 August 2010.

External links

Living people
Russian male canoeists
ICF Canoe Sprint World Championships medalists in Canadian
People from Khujand
1987 births
Universiade medalists in canoeing
Universiade gold medalists for Russia
Universiade silver medalists for Russia
Medalists at the 2013 Summer Universiade